Plastun is an urban locality (an urban-type settlement) and the most populous settlement of Terneysky District of Primorsky Krai, Russia. Population:

History
It was founded in 1907 and named after the corvette Plastun which was surveying the coasts of Primorye in 1859.

Economy
The industry of settlement is represented by a port and timber processing enterprises. There is an airport near Plastun with regular flights to Kavalerovo and Vladivostok.

References

Urban-type settlements in Primorsky Krai
Populated places established in 1907